The 1971 Spanish Grand Prix was a Formula One motor race held at the Montjuïc circuit on April 18, 1971. It was race 2 of 11 in both the 1971 World Championship of Drivers and the 1971 International Cup for Formula One Manufacturers. The 75-lap race was won by Tyrrell driver Jackie Stewart after he started from fourth position. Jacky Ickx finished second for the Ferrari team and Matra driver Chris Amon came in third.

This was notably the first Formula One race in which slick tyres were used. The tyres were introduced by Firestone, based on its experience in American open wheel racing series. The race itself was held in the morning.

Classification

Qualifying

Race

Championship standings after the race

Drivers' Championship standings

Constructors' Championship standings

Note: Only the top five positions are included for both sets of standings.

References

External links

Spanish Grand Prix
Spanish Grand Prix
1971 in Spanish motorsport
Spanish